Telephone numbers in Turkey went from six (2+4) to seven digits (3+4) local phone numbers c.1988, at which time Ankara went from 41 to 4. There used to be more than 5,000 local area codes of varying lengths (one to five digits) with correspondingly varying local number lengths (seven to three digits).

The new system is based on 3 three-digit area codes for provinces and seven digit local phone numbers. Istanbul is the exception and it gets two area codes ([212] for the European and [216] for the Asian side).

Calling a cell phone from outside Turkey is the same except the three digit numbers are replaced with the ones of the companies. Like [9] + [0] + [cell company id number] + [seven digit number]. The following are the company identification numbers for the major mobile telephone providers: Turkcell (530-539, 561), Vodafone (540-549) and Türk Telekom (500-509 and 550-559).

Local numbers in most areas were also changed in conjunction with the numbering plan that took effect 30 August 1993.

If a former area code is indicated, this is for the major centre in the new area code's district. The new area codes will also replace former area codes other than the primary one mentioned.

General information

The country calling code of Turkey is 90.

Language digit: 0 (Direct Dialing)
Language digit: 2 (Operator Assistance)
National (significant) number: 10 Digits.
 Area code: 3 digits
 Local subscriber's number: 7 digits.
 Only exception in this is the call center numbers which start with 444, the call center numbers cannot be dialed with area code, they must be dialed with 7 digit from any phone (Landlines & Mobiles) in the country. The number format is 444 XX XX. For dialing the Call Center numbers from other countries, the number must be dialed as Country Code + Call Center Number like 90 444 XX XX. If you dial the Call Center number with the area code you will hear an IVR announce saying you must not use area code while dialing the call center number.
Dialing procedure:
A call from another country would have the following dialing format:

 Access to automatic telephone service within Turkey:
trunk / inner - city code number : 0

 Access to international telephone service from Turkey:
international code : 00

Note: After 3-digit area codes, subscriber numbers cannot be prefaced with the number 1. The number 1 is only to be used for certain special services.
 International Switched Digital Service:

Ankara DMS-300

Istanbul DMS-300

İzmir DMS-300

Ankara, İstanbul and İzmir DMS-300 International Exchanges Accept:

L/D + area code + subscriber number + ST
L /D = language digit : 0 (direct dialing)
L /D = language digit : 2 (operator assistance)

 Operator Access Code:

There are two international operator centers in Turkey, Ankara and İstanbul.
Each one of these centers provides operator telephone services according ITU/T dialing:

L/D + code11 + ST (Random)
L/D + code12 + 312 + ST (Ankara)
L/D + code12 + 212 + ST (İstanbul)

L/D: language digit 2 English
C11: operator assistance
C12: international transits
ST: stop pulse

The operators of the international exchanges in Ankara and Istanbul are available under C11 and C12.

 Local Time: UTC + 3 hours

List of area codes

List of mobile codes

Note: These are the codes that wireless operators in Turkey assign to new subscribers. Because of mobile number portability, a subscriber's telephone number may not accurately reflect their actual operator.

List of other special domestic codes

External links
 Page of Turkish Telecom's website on City codes of Turkey 

Turkey
Telecommunications in Turkey
Telephone numbers